Carla Bazzanella (6 August 1947 – 1 July 2022) was an Italian linguist.

Bazzanella was born in Turin. After graduating in classics from the University of Turin in 1971, Carla Bazzanella became a lecturer and researcher at the University of Pavia. She held this post from 1976 to 1983. After that she moved back to Turin, and taught glottology and philosophy of language until 1998. Since 2001 she had been an associate professor of linguistics at the University of Turin, where she taught both general linguistics and cognitive linguistics. She retired in 2012, but was active in the academic debate.

Bazzanella was a contributor to Journal of Pragmatics, Pragmatics and Cognition, and Language Sciences. She was also a member of the Società di Linguistica Italiana, the Associazione Italiana di Scienze Cognitive, and the International Pragmatics Association.

Death 
She died on 1 July 2022, at the age of 74.

Bibliography
 C. Bazzanella, La sociolinguistica in classe. Problemi e ricerche nella scuola media dell'obbligo, Rome, Bulzoni, 1980
 C. Bazzanella, Le facce del parlare. Un approccio pragmatico all'italiano parlato, Florence, La Nuova Italia, 1994
 C. Bazzanella, I segnali discorsivi, in Grande grammatica italiana di consultazione, a cura di L. Renzi, G. Salvi, A. Cardinaletti, Bologna, il Mulino, 1995
 Repetition in Dialogue, edited by C. Bazzanella, Tübingen, Niemeyer, 1996
 C. Bazzanella, Intrecci lingua e scienze, in I modi di fare scienze, edited by F. Alfieri, M. Arcà, P. Guidoni, Turin, Bollati Boringhieri, 2000
 Passioni, emozioni, affetti, edited by C. Bazzanella, P. Kobau, Milan, McGraw e Hill, 2002
 Gender and New Literacy: A Multilingual Analysis, edited by E. Thüne, S. Leonardi, C. Bazzanella, London, Continuum, 2006
 C. Bazzanella, Linguistica e pragmatica del linguaggio. Un'introduzione, Rome-Bari, Laterza, 2008
 C. Bazzanella, L'approccio cognitivo alla metafora nel linguaggio giuridico, in Fondamenti cognitivi del diritto, edited by C. Raffaele, Milan, Bruno Mondadori, 2008

References

1947 births
2022 deaths
Linguists from Italy
Women linguists
University of Turin alumni
Academic staff of the University of Turin
20th-century linguists
21st-century linguists
People from Turin